Siegfried Pachale is a German former Olympic discus thrower. He represented East Germany in the men's discus throw at the 1976 Summer Olympics. His distance was a 60.64 in the qualifiers, and a 64.24 in the finals. He is the father of German volleyball player Hanka Pachale.

References

Living people
1949 births
East German discus throwers
Olympic athletes of East Germany
Athletes (track and field) at the 1976 Summer Olympics
People from Elsterwerda
Sportspeople from Brandenburg